Erwin Nuytinck (born 17 January 1994) is a Dutch football player who plays as a midfielder. He is currently without a club and formerly played for RBC Roosendaal and Excelsior.

References

External links
 Voetbal International profile 

1994 births
Living people
Dutch footballers
Association football midfielders
RBC Roosendaal players
Excelsior Rotterdam players
Eredivisie players
Eerste Divisie players
Sportspeople from Goes
Alphense Boys players
Footballers from Zeeland